Joycelyn Tetteh (born 10 January 1988) is a Member of Parliament of the National Democratic Congress party for the North Dayi Constituency. She is one of the 36 female parliamentarian of the seventh parliament of the fourth republic of Ghana. Jocelyn is also currently the ambassador for human trafficking in Ghana.

Early life and education 
Tetteh was born in Tsyome-Sabadu, Volta Region.
She studied Law and BEd in Management Studies at the University of Cape Coast.

Politics 
In 2016, she contested and won the NDC parliamentary seat for the North Dayi Constituency in the Volta Region.

Honour 
She was honored in August 2019 by the Chiefs and people of the North Dayi Constituency and conferred on her the title; Mama Edzeame.

Personal life 
She is single and a Christian.

References 

1988 births
Living people
University of Cape Coast alumni
National Democratic Congress (Ghana) politicians
21st-century Ghanaian women politicians
People from Volta Region
Women members of the Parliament of Ghana
Ghanaian MPs 2017–2021
Ghanaian MPs 2021–2025